The 1932 Arkansas State Indians football team represented Arkansas State College—now known as Arkansas State University—as a member of the Arkansas Intercollegiate Conference (AIC) during the 1932 college football season. Led by second-year head coach Jack Dale, the Indians compiled an overall record of 3–4 with a mark of 1–4 in conference play.

Schedule

References

Arkansas State
Arkansas State Red Wolves football seasons
Arkansas State Indians football